Widening may refer to:

Lexicology
 Semantic change#Types of semantic change

Computer Science
 Widening (computer science), several techniques used in verification.